Rivières is a commune in the Charente department in southwestern France.
The names originate from the 2 rivers crossing the municipality: La Tardoire and le Bandiat.

Population

See also
Communes of the Charente department

References

Communes of Charente